Lincoln is an unincorporated community in Scandia Valley Township, Morrison County, Minnesota, United States.  The community is located along U.S. Highway 10 near Holt Road.  320th Street and Azure Road are also in the immediate area.  Nearby places include Motley, Cushing, and Little Falls.

History
Lincoln was platted in 1893, and named for Abraham Lincoln, 16th President of the United States. A post office was established at Lincoln in 1890, and remained in operation until 1954.

References

Unincorporated communities in Morrison County, Minnesota
Unincorporated communities in Minnesota